Great Britain, represented by the British Olympic Association (BOA), competed at the 1976 Summer Olympics in Montreal, Quebec, Canada. 242 competitors, 176 men and 66 women, took part in 148 events in 17 sports. British athletes have competed in every Summer Olympic Games.

Medallists
Great Britain finished in 13th position in the final medal rankings, with 3 gold and 13 total medals.

Gold
 John Osborn and Reg White — Sailing, Tornado
 Jim Fox, Danny Nightingale and Adrian Parker — Modern Pentathlon, Men's Team Competition
 David Wilkie — Swimming, Men's 200m Breaststroke

Silver
 Keith Remfry — Judo, Men's Open Class
 Michael Hart and Chris Baillieu — Rowing, Men's Double Sculls
 Jim Clark, Tim Crooks, Richard Lester, Hugh Matheson, David Maxwell, Lenny Robertson, John Yallop, Patrick Sweeney, and Frederick Smallbone — Rowing, Men's Eights
 David Wilkie — Swimming, Men's 100m Breaststroke
 Julian Brooke Houghton and Rodney Pattisson (Helmsman) — Sailing, Flying Dutchman

Bronze
 Brendan Foster — Athletics, Men's 10000 metres
 Patrick Cowdell — Boxing, Men's Bantamweight
 Ian Banbury, Michael Bennett, Robin Croker, and Ian Hallam — Cycling, Men's 4000m Team Pursuit
 David Starbrook — Judo, Men's Half-Heavyweight (93 kg)
 Alan McClatchey, David Dunne, Gordon Downie, Brian Brinkley — Swimming, Men's 4 × 200 m Freestyle Relay

Archery

In the second appearance by Great Britain in modern Olympic archery, two men and two women represented the country.  The best finishers in each division placed 21st.

Women's Individual Competition:
 Patricia Conway – 2257 points (→ 21st place)
 Rachael Fenwick – 2199 points (→ 23rd place)

Men's Individual Competition:
 David Pink – 2347 points (→ 21st place)
 Stewart Littlefair – 2238 points (→ 30th place)

Athletics

Men's 200 metres
Ainsley Bennett
 Heat— 21.26
 Quarter Final — 21.07
 Semi Final — 21.52 (→ did not advance)

Men's 400 metres
David Jenkins
 Heat— 46.60
 Quarter Final — 46.18
 Semi Final — 45.20.
 Final — 45.57 (→ 7th place)

Glen Cohen
 Heat— 47.77
 Quarter Final — 47.67 (did not advance)

Men's 800 metres
 Steve Ovett
 Heat — 1:48.27
 Semi Final — 1:46.14
 Final — 1:45.44 (→ 5th place)

 Frank Clement
 Heat — 1:47.51
 Semi Final — 1:48.28 (→ did not advance)

Men's 1500 metres
 Frank Clement
 Heat — 3:37:53
 Semi Final — 3.38.92
 Final — 3.39.65 (→ 5th place)

 Dave Moorcroft
 Heat — 3.40.69
 Semi Final — 3.39.88
 Final — 3.40.94 (→ 7th place)

 Steve Ovett
 Heat — 3.37.89
 Semi Final — 3.40.34 (→ did not advance)

Men's 10.000 metres
 Brendan Foster
 Heat — 28:22.19
 Final — 27:54.92 (→  Bronze Medal)

 Tony Simmons
 Heat — 28:01.82
 Final — 27:56.26 (→ 4th place)

 Bernie Ford
 Heat — 28:17.26
 Final — 28:17.78 (→ 8th place)

Men's 4 × 400 m Relay 
 Ainsley Bennett, Glen Cohen, David Jenkins, and Alan Pascoe
 Heat — did not finish (→ did not advance)

Men's 400m Hurdles
 Alan Pascoe
 Heats — 51.66s
 Semi Final — 49.95s
 Final — 51.29s (→ 8th place)

Men's Long Jump 
 Roy Mitchell
 Heat — 7.69m (→ did not advance)

Men's Marathon
 Jeffrey Norman — 2:20:04 (→ 26th place)
 Keith Angus — 2:22:18 (→ 31st place)
 Barry Watson — 2:28:32 (→ 45th place)

Men's 20 km Race Walk
 Brian Adams — 1:30:46 (→ 11th place)
 Olly Flynn — 1:31:42 (→ 14th place)
 Paul Nihill — 1:36:40 (→ 30th place)

Men's Hammer Throw
 Chris Black
 Qualification — 70.76 m
 Final — 73.18 m (→ 7th place)

 Paul Dickenson
 Qualification — 68.52 m (→ did not advance, 14th place)

Women's Long Jump
 Sue Reeve
 Qualifying Round — 6.26m
 Final — 6.27m (→ 9th place)

Boxing

Canoeing

Cycling

Eleven cyclists represented Great Britain in 1976.

Individual road race
 Joseph Waugh — 4:49:01 (→ 35th place)
 Dudley Hayton — 4:54:26 (→ 43rd place)
 Philip Griffiths — did not finish (→ no ranking)
 William Nickson — did not finish (→ no ranking)

Team time trial
 Paul Carbutt
 Phil Griffiths
 Dudley Hayton
 William Nickson

Sprint
 Trevor Gadd — 12th place

1000m time trial
 Paul Medhurst — 1:10.167 (→ 19th place)

Individual pursuit
 Ian Hallam — 20th place

Team pursuit
 Ian Banbury
 Michael Bennett
 Robin Croker
 Ian Hallam

Diving

Equestrian

Fencing

18 fencers, 13 men and 5 women, represented Great Britain in 1976.

Men's foil
 Graham Paul
 Rob Bruniges
 Barry Paul

Men's team foil
 Geoffrey Grimmett, Barry Paul, Rob Bruniges, Graham Paul, Nick Bell

Men's épée
 Ralph Johnson
 Teddy Bourne
 Tim Belson

Men's team épée
 Teddy Bourne, Bill Hoskyns, Ralph Johnson, Tim Belson, Martin Beevers

Men's sabre
 Richard Cohen
 John Deanfield
 Peter Mather

Men's team sabre
 Bill Hoskyns, Peter Mather, John Deanfield, Richard Cohen

Women's foil
 Susan Wrigglesworth
 Clare Henley-Halsted
 Wendy Ager-Grant

Women's team foil
 Wendy Ager-Grant, Susan Wrigglesworth, Hilary Cawthorne, Clare Henley-Halsted, Sue Green

Gymnastics

Judo

Modern pentathlon

Three male pentathletes represented Great Britain in 1976, winning gold in the team event.

Individual
 Adrian Parker
 Danny Nightingale
 Jim Fox

Team
 Adrian Parker
 Danny Nightingale
 Jim Fox

Rowing

Men's double sculls
 Michael Hart, Chris Baillieu
 (→ Silver)

Men's coxless pair  
David Sturge, Henry Clay
 (→ 12th place)

Men's coxed pair
 Neil Christie, James MacLeod, David Webb
 (→ 7th place)

Men's quadruple scull 
Thomas Bishop, Mark Hayter, Andrew Justice, Allan Whitwell
 (→ 9th place)

Men's coxless four 
Richard Ayling, Bill Mason, Neil Keron, David Townsend
 (→ 12th place)

Men's eight 
 Jim Clark, Tim Crooks, Richard Lester, Hugh Matheson, David Maxwell, Lenny Robertson, John Yallop, Patrick Sweeney, and Frederick Smallbone
 (→ Silver)

Women's coxless pair  
 Lin Clark, Beryl Mitchell
 (→ 10th place)

Women's coxed four
Gillian Webb, Pauline Bird-Hart, Clare Grove, Diana Bishop, Pauline Wright
 (→ 8th place)

Sailing

Shooting

Swimming

Weightlifting

Wrestling

References

Nations at the 1976 Summer Olympics
1976 Summer Olympics
Summer Olympics